Popilnia is an urban-type settlement in Zhytomyr Raion, Zhytomyr Oblast, Ukraine. It is the administrative center of Popilnia Raion. Population:  In 2001, population was 6,109.

References

Urban-type settlements in Zhytomyr Raion
Skvirsky Uyezd
Zhytomyr Raion